Both Old World and New World quail include edible species. The common quail used to be much favoured in French cooking, but quail for the table are now more likely to be domesticated Japanese quail. The common quail is also part of Polish cuisine, Maltese cuisine, Italian cuisine, Mexican cuisine, and Indian cuisine. Quail are commonly eaten complete with the bones, since these are easily chewed and the small size of the bird makes it inconvenient to remove them.

Quail that have fed on hemlock (e.g., during migration) may induce acute kidney injury due to accumulation of toxic substances from the hemlock in the meat; this problem is referred to as "coturnism".

A persistent myth holds that it is impossible to eat quail every day for a month. This has been the subject of a number of proposition bets; however, it has been achieved on several occasions.  

This "every-day-for-a-month" estimation may have been derived from a Biblical passage about quail.  The children of Israel, having become tired of eating manna, demanded flesh to eat.  God then gave them quail, but with this warning: "Ye shall not eat one day, nor two days, nor five days, neither ten days, nor twenty days; but even a whole month, until it come out at your nostrils, and it be loathsome unto you: because that ye have despised the Lord which is among you, and have wept before him, saying, Why came we forth out of Egypt?" (Numbers 11:19-20, KJV).  Later in the passage, we are told, "And while the flesh was yet between their teeth, ere it was chewed, the wrath of the Lord was kindled against the people, and the Lord smote the people with a very great plague" (Numbers 11:33, KJV).

A 19th-century recipe from California for Codornices a la española (Spanish-style quail) was prepared by stuffing quails with a mixture of mushroom, green onion, parsley, butter, lemon juice and thyme. The birds were brushed with lard, bread crumbs and beaten eggs and finished in the oven. A savory pie could be made with quail, salt pork, eggs and fresh herbs.

Kosher status
Only certain species of quail are considered kosher. The Orthodox Union certifies Coturnix coturnix as kosher based upon the masorah of Rabbi Shlomo Zev Zweigenhaft.

See also
Quail eggs

References

Meat by animal
Cuisine of the Southern United States
Cuisine of the Western United States
French cuisine
Indian cuisine
Italian cuisine
Japanese cuisine
Maltese cuisine
Mexican cuisine
Polish cuisine
Portuguese cuisine
Spanish cuisine